The Kingdom Caledonian Amateur Football Association (KCAFA) was a football (soccer) league competition for amateur clubs in the Fife area of Scotland. It was formed in 1984 when the top sides from the East Fife A.F.A. and the Kirkcaldy & District A. F. L. broke away and amalgamated with the aim of creating a highly competitive league with fewer games in an effort to raise the quality and the profile of amateur football in Fife. The association was affiliated to the Scottish Amateur Football Association.

The association was composed of one single division, the Kingdom Caledonian Football League. The league folded in 2017 and merged with the Fife Amateur Football Association to create the Kingdom of Fife AFA.

League Membership
In order to join the association, clubs need to apply and are then voted in by current member clubs.

Last Members
(as of 2016–17 season)
Aberdour Sporting Development Club AFC (previously Rosyth Civil Service AFC)
Balgonie Scotia 1896 AFC
Bowhill Rovers AFC
Cupar Hearts AFC
Eastvale AFC
Falkland AFC
Glenrothes AFC
Greig Park Rangers AFC
Kettle United AFC
Kinross AFC
Leven United AFC
Lumphinnans United AFC
Strathmiglo United AFC

Previous Members 
Aberdour
Auchtermuchty Bellvue
Ballingry Rovers (Scottish Junior Football Association)
Benarty (Folded)
Blairhall Village (Folded)
Buckhaven Villa
Burntisland Shipyard
Burntisland United
Cowdenbeath (Folded)
Fair City
Hill of Beath Ramblers
Inverkeithing Hillfield Swifts (Fife Amateur Football Association)
Kinglassie
Kirkland (Folded)
 Star Hearts (Scottish Junior Football Association)
Lomond Victoria (Fife Amateur Football Association)
Milnathort
Norton House (Folded)
Tayport (Scottish Junior Football Association)
Victoria Rovers
Windygates
Woodside Athletic

Past winners

1984–85 – Ballingry Rovers
1985–86 – Strathmiglo United
1986–87 – ?
1987–88 – Star Hearts
1988–89 – ?
1989–90 – ?
1990–91 – Norton House
1991–92 – Strathmiglo United
1992–93 – Norton House
1993–94 – ?
1994–95 – ?
1995–96 – Norton House
1996–97 – Benarty
1997–98 – Fair City
1998–99 – Fair City
1999–00 – Norton House
2000–01 – Cupar Hearts

2001–02 – ?
2002–03 – Eastvale
2003–04 – Eastvale
2004–05 – Eastvale
2005–06 – Strathmiglo United
2006–07 – Rosyth Civil Service
2007–08 – Cupar Hearts
2008–09 – Leven United
2009–10 – Cupar Hearts
2010–11 – Cupar Hearts
2011–12 – Cupar Hearts
2012–13 – Cupar Hearts
2013–14 – Bowhill Rovers
2014–15 – Greig Park Rangers
2015–16 – Leven United
2016–17 – Bowhill Rovers

External links
Kingdom Caledonian Football League Website
Kingdom League Forum

Football in Fife
1984 establishments in Scotland
Defunct football leagues in Scotland
2017 disestablishments in Scotland